Westhill Institute is a Pre-K-12 American international school in Mexico City. It has three campuses: two in Lomas de Chapultepec in Miguel Hidalgo, the Athos and Carpatos campuses; and the Santa Fe campus in Cuajimalpa. The Athos campus has preschool, the Carpatos campus has preschool and elementary school, and the Santa Fe campus has all levels from preschool to high school.

History
The school system was founded in 1992. The Santa Fe campus opened with elementary grades in 2002, and it gained middle and high school levels in 2003.

Student body
As of 2017, about 60% of students have Mexican citizenship and 44 countries and cultures are included in the remaining 40%. Most students have parents working in international business and diplomatic sectors. Companies of parents with students in the school include Grupo Bimbo, Coca-Cola, PepsiCo, Scotia Bank, Jumex, HSBC, Grupo Santander, Banamex, Telmex, Liverpool, and Movistar. 

The school classified 10% of the student body as special needs students.

See also
 American immigration to Mexico

References

External links
 Westhill Institute

American international schools in Mexico City
High schools in Mexico City
1992 establishments in Mexico
Educational institutions established in 1992
Private schools in Mexico
International Baccalaureate schools in Mexico